Ardagger is a town in the district of Amstetten in Lower Austria in Austria.

Geography
Ardagger lies in southwest Lower Austria, between the Danube and the hills of the Mostviertel.

References

Cities and towns in Amstetten District